S. M. Dedicated High School (commonly known as SMD High School and SMD School) is a private K-12, co-educational school located in Srinagar city at Munawar-abad, India.

History
SMD School is named after its founder and Chairman Sayeed Mustafa Danishgah. It was established in 1969.

Organisation
This is a private, co-educational school that uses English as the medium of education. SMD was formerly a high school educating from nursery to tenth grade but is now a higher secondary serving students up to 12th grade. The school has over 500 students.

Houses
The student body is divided into four houses, represented by colours. Each student is allotted one of these houses upon entry into school. 
The four houses are:
 Green
 Pink
 Yellow
 Sky Blue

The houses compete against each other in academic and sporting disciplines, each contributing towards house points. The house with maximum points is declared the House Of The Year.

Other functions
The school is used as a polling station.

References

Schools in Srinagar
High schools and secondary schools in Jammu and Kashmir
Private schools in Jammu and Kashmir
Educational institutions established in 1969
1969 establishments in Jammu and Kashmir